Caulfield Grammar School is an independent, co-educational, Anglican, International Baccalaureate, day and boarding school, located in Melbourne, Victoria, Australia. Founded in 1881 as a boys' school, Caulfield Grammar began admitting girls exactly one hundred years later. The school amalgamated with Malvern Memorial Grammar School (MMGS) in 1961, with the MMGS campus becoming Malvern Campus.

Caulfield Grammar has three-day campuses in Victoria, Caulfield (Years 7–12), Wheelers Hill (Kindergarten–Year 12), and Malvern House (Kindergarten–Year 6). It has an outdoor education campus at Yarra Junction, and a student centre in Nanjing, China where the Year 9 internationalism programme is conducted. Caulfield Grammar is the only Melbourne-based APS school to provide boarding for both boys and girls, with 95 boarding students, and is the second largest school in Victoria, currently catering for 3,315 students.

History 

Joseph Henry Davies, who had served as a missionary in southern India, purchased the site for the school — it was adjacent to the Elsternwick railway station, and had been a small lolly shop — for £25 on 16 April and employed his sister and two brothers as teachers. Davies' aim was "that the School should be a thoroughly Christian one" that looked to render "Christian service".

Although the school was originally located in Elsternwick, it is thought to have been named Caulfield Grammar School because Caulfield was the regional locality — and the geographical boundaries of Melbourne's suburban areas were not strictly defined or precisely named at the time — also, it is significant that the vicar of St Mary's Anglican Church in Caulfield had provided Davies with support when opening the school. Davies had gone to India under the auspices of St Mary's, having been a member of the church for several years before that.

Caulfield Grammar School was founded on 25 April 1881, by Davies, with just nine pupils. Davies' original intention was to commence classes on Wednesday, 20 April 1881; however, due to circumstances that were never clearly explained, Davies postponed the school's opening, at the last minute, until Monday, 25 April 1881.

Davies later went to Korea as a missionary under the auspices of the Victorian Presbyterian church, having been ordained as Presbyterian minister at Scots' Church, Melbourne on 5 August 1889; he had broken from the Church of England and, through this act, also broken from the Church Missionary Society.

A year after opening, the school had 32 students enrolled. To house the growing student body, the school then moved to a nearby small building, later destroyed in a fire in 1890. In 1896, the school subsumed Hawksburn Grammar School, a smaller local Christian school, situated in Wynnstay Road, Prahran, after Hawksburn's headmaster, Walter Murray Buntine, was appointed as headmaster at Caulfield Grammar. Hawksburn's 55 students subsequently transferred to Caulfield Grammar. The current site, a property near Sir Frederick Sargood's Rippon Lea Estate on what is now Glen Eira Road, St Kilda East was purchased in 1909.  Classes began on the site on 9 February 1909 and the school's boarding house opened in 1912.

By 1931, the school's 50th anniversary, attendance had grown to 500 students but Caulfield Grammar was still considered small compared to schools such as Scotch College, Melbourne, Wesley College Melbourne and Melbourne Grammar School. To celebrate the Golden Jubilee, a Jubilee Fair was held at the school in May. In the same year, the school moved from private ownership to a registered company governed by a School Council, an organisational structure still used today, with formal affiliation with the Church of England. In 1958 Caulfield Grammar joined the exclusive Associated Public Schools of Victoria school sporting competition. Caulfield Grammar was Victoria's fifth largest school in 1959, with over 800 students.

In 1961, Caulfield Grammar School affiliated with Malvern Memorial Grammar School. Malvern Grammar School opened in 1890 as a boys-only secondary school and in 1924 moved into the Valentine's Mansion, formerly the home of Sir John Mark Davies (no relation to the school's founder), a Victorian Cabinet minister. The mansion was built in 1892 and contains a large ballroom. Valentine's Mansion has been listed as a place of historical and architecture significance by both the Victorian Heritage Register and the Register of the National Estate.

The school was renamed Malvern Memorial Grammar School in 1948 to honour old boys who had fought in World Wars I and II. Malvern Memorial Grammar School amalgamated with Shaw House in 1971 and became the Malvern Campus, a primary school located in the Valentine's Mansion, and its students began to wear the Caulfield Grammar School uniform. From 1949 to 1979, Caulfield Grammar had operated Shaw House, its primary school located in Mayfield Street, St Kilda East, offering kindergarten and schooling from Years 1 to 3.

During the 1960s and 1970s, student activism saw changes in the school's policies relating to students. Appointed prefects were replaced in 1970 by an elected School Committee to represent the student body, the publication of a student newsletter Demos—containing editorials on aspects of the school—was allowed, religious education classes were made voluntary for senior year levels, the position of school chaplain was abolished, and Caulfield Grammar was the only APS school to allow its students to participate in moratorium marches protesting the Vietnam War on 8 May 1970.

The school's centenary year, 1981, marked the appearance of the first girls at Caulfield Grammar, as a second senior school campus opened at Wheelers Hill on 26 April. Caulfield Grammar had purchased the land for a future project in 1969, and a new campus was established to celebrate the centenary. Wheelers Hill began as a coeducational school for all year levels. In 1993, the other campuses opened to girls, making Caulfield Grammar fully co-educational.

The school established a computer network in 1997 with all students and staff having individual log in details, email accounts, and file space. The school provides an online login system or Intranet for students and staff that is accessed via existing entry passwords and usernames. This capability is referred to as the School's sixth or "virtual" campus, and enables access to email and files from the school network over the Internet. In 2019, the school released an app called CaulfieldLife, allowing students and staff to access a range of information from their personal devices.

The school's historic War Memorial Hall, opened by Sir Dallas Brooks, the Governor of Victoria, on 27 April 1958, had cost some £50,000 (approx. $12 million in 2016) to construct on the Caulfield Grammar Campus. In the early morning of 7 November 2000, the "Cup Day" public holiday, a fierce fire broke out in the then-being-refurbished building (just two weeks away from completion); the roof collapsed, and the entire building was destroyed — only Alan Sumner's stained glass memorial windows escaped damage.

The school then began to plan the construction of major halls at both the Caulfield Grammar and the Wheelers Hill campuses, naming the project "The Twin Halls". The Memorial Hall at Wheelers Hill was officially opened on 28 July 2005, and the "Cripps Centre", its counterpart on the Caulfield Grammar Campus opened on 25 October 2005. Each hall seats 650 people: the Wheelers Hill hall including a new chapel fitted with a multimedia centre, and the Caulfield Grammar hall including a music/visual art department.

The 125th anniversary of Caulfield Grammar's founding was marked in 2006 and various events were held in commemoration. On 26 April 2006, the school community held a day of celebrations (ANZAC Day—a national public holiday—is held in Australia on 25 April, the actual anniversary of the founding). Staff and students at all five campuses of the school—with student groups visiting both the Nanjing and Yarra Junction campuses at the time—formed "125TH" at their respective campuses and an aerial photograph was taken. Other celebrations during the year included a 125th Anniversary Ball at Crown Casino for past and present staff and parents, as well as past students. The annual Founders' Day service at St Paul's Cathedral was attended by guest of honour, Governor of Victoria Dr. David de Kretser, a past parent of the school. The School Council commissioned author Helen Penrose to write a history of the school entitled Outside the Square, which was released in 2006.

Caulfield Grammar School now has over 3,000 students throughout its three-day campuses. It is the only Melbourne-based school in the APS to provide boarding for both boys and girls, with nearly 100 boarding students from rural Australia, Melbourne and overseas.

The school is a member of the Associated Public Schools of Victoria (APS), and is affiliated with the Headmasters' and Headmistresses' Conference, the Association of Heads of Independent Schools of Australia (AHISA), the Junior School Heads Association of Australia (JSHAA), the Australian Boarding Schools' Association, and the Association of Independent Schools of Victoria (AISV).

Yarra Junction Campus 
In 1947, a country centre opened at Yarra Junction on land donated by the Cuming family. Cuming House was the first outdoor education campus for an Australian school, set in the Australian bush and close to the Yarra River. The Yarra Junction Campus today allows students to live in sustainable eco-cabins with rainwater tanks and solar power technology. The Earth Studies Centre, Wadambawilam (Aboriginal term for 'learning place'), operates on wind and solar power, and uses many environmentally sound practices to teach students about long-term environmental sustainability. Also on campus is a commercial dairy which produces over 1 million litres of milk annually. On United Nations World Environment Day 2001 the Yarra Junction Campus won an award for Best School Based Environment Project for its energy-saving eco-cabins project.

Nanjing Campus 

The school opened a fifth campus in Nanjing, China in 1998, with a residential campus constructed on property owned by the High School Affiliated to Nanjing Normal University. This became the first overseas campus for an Australian high school, and the first campus established by a foreign secondary school in China.
It is staffed by six full-time Australian teachers, as well as six trainees selected from the school's annual graduating Year 12 class who complete 12-month gap year placements. Most Caulfield Grammar Year 9 students take part in five-week internationalism programs and are based in Nanjing.

Former Australian Prime Minister John Howard and then-Victorian Premier Jeff Kennett both sent formal congratulations letters to Caulfield Grammar on the campus' establishment, and Australian Minister for Foreign Affairs Alexander Downer witnessed the signing of an agreement to build the campus in 1996; also present were the Mayor of Nanjing, the Principal of the High School Affiliated to Nanjing Normal University, and Caulfield Grammar's principal Stephen Newton. The Governor of Victoria James Gobbo officially opened the campus on 6 May 1998. Caulfield Grammar focuses on Mandarin Chinese as its major Language Other Than English, with the language first offered as a senior school subject in 1963, and later becoming the sole Asian language taught as it had higher student enrolments than Indonesian. It has been taught at every year level across all three campuses since 1994, and the establishment of a campus in Nanjing allowed the school to strengthen its ties with the region. Nanjing was selected as the campus' location in part because Jiangsu province, of which Nanjing is the capital and largest city, is Victoria's sister-state, and Nanjing University had previously established an Australian studies department.

When a global outbreak of severe acute respiratory syndrome (SARS) occurred in 2003, and had the highest confirmed cases in China, the school postponed all scheduled trips to China in 2003 indefinitely. The group which was in China at the time of the outbreak – March and April 2003 – travelled to Xi'an instead of Beijing to avoid the peak areas of infection, and returned to Australia via Tokyo's International Airport several days before the scheduled departure on the advice of the Australian Department of Foreign Affairs and Trade. The remaining groups returned in the second half of 2003 to participate in shortened three-week programmes.

On 5 May 2008, Caulfield Grammar celebrated the tenth anniversary of the Nanjing Campus and held two concerts hosted at the High School Affiliated to Nanjing Normal University.

Stephen Newton, Caulfield Grammar's principal from 1993 to 2011, was made an Officer of the Order of Australia in 2012, for "distinguished service to education in the independent schools sector, through executive roles with professional organisations and advisory bodies, and to the development of educational development opportunities with China," recognising his role in founding the Nanjing Campus.

Headmasters and principals 
Caulfield Grammar School has had 10 headmasters and principals over its 141 years of operation. The current principal is Ashleigh Martin, who was appointed in 2018 after the retirement of Rev. Andrew Syme.

Academics 
Caulfield Grammar School offers students a wide range of subjects in its academic curriculum. All students study a language in the middle school where they can choose to study Mandarin Chinese, French, or German. Students may continue these languages as electives thereafter. The school awards scholarships for a range of fields, including academic excellence, theatre, music, art and sports.

Middle school structure
Caulfield Grammar School has reorganised the early years of secondary school, which had previously been overshadowed by the VCE (Years 10–12) and attempts to upgrade programmes for senior students. Years 7 through 9 make up the middle school, and operate differently from the later VCE years. New initiatives at the middle school include a learning mentor programme, introduced in 2004 at the Year 8 level, and expanded to Year 7 in 2005. This provides every class with two teachers to around 30 students. Each class is assigned a learning mentor, who attends all of that group's lessons and assists each student with improving their own learning style. The mentor focuses on both academic and pastoral issues, while the designated subject teacher is responsible for preparing and teaching the set curriculum.

Year 9 at Caulfield Grammar is seen as a year where students prepare to undertake the VCE (Years 10–12). Students do not have examinations, as would happen in any other senior school year at Caulfield Grammar, but rather focus on their classroom studies and the Learning Journeys programme. Learning Journeys is a combination of various subjects previously studied in Year 9 – history, geography, religious education and personal development – with students working in groups of around 15 pupils to one teacher. Classes last for one full school day each week, and students regularly participate in numerous excursions as part of the subject's curriculum.

Year 9 is also the year in which most students participate in the China internationalism programme at the Nanjing campus. Approximately 300 students attend the campus annually; students who do not take part in the programme study international culture in Australia and are based in Melbourne. Students study five key themes of Chinese culture during one of six five-week programmes offered throughout the year: heritage, work, family, education and environment. Students are based at the residential campus in Nanjing, and also spend three days in Shanghai as well as four days in Beijing, with lessons based around visits to sites such as the Great Wall of China, the Forbidden City and the Ming Xiaoling Mausoleum. They also complete two-day homestay visits with students from the High School Affiliated to Nanjing Normal University, and participate in English and Mandarin language lessons with their homestay partners. In addition to the Year 9 programmes, a two-week study tour for Year 11 students studying Chinese as a Second Language is held annually in the break between Term 3 and 4. These students travel to the Nanjing campus for language lessons and activities, including a homestay visit with students from the High School Affiliated to Nanjing Normal University, and also spend time in Shanghai and Xian.

Victorian Certificate of Education 
Caulfield Grammar School senior students study for the Victorian Certificate of Education (Caulfield Grammar does not offer the International Baccalaureate in the senior school), achieved after graduating from Year 12. While the VCE is usually completed over two years, in 2003 Caulfield Grammar began to encourage Year 10 students to take as many as three VCE Unit 1/2 courses usually studied at Year 11. This programme is seen as giving students a taste of the VCE a year earlier, thereby giving them a chance to prepare for what is to come; it also allows Year 11 students to undertake Unit 3/4 studies, so that they effectively begin part of their Year 12 course a year earlier, maximising their ATAR scores by studying up to six subjects over this time.

Year 11 students studying Mandarin may return to China on a two-week language-focused study tour at the Nanjing campus. For students studying German, there are places available for exchanges to Germany during the summer holidays.

Both of Caulfield's campuses ranked in the top 40 schools in Victoria for 2009 results, including the top 30 amongst private schools. Caulfield Grammar also has associations with Australian universities which have led to the introduction of annual awards for VCE students at the school. One Year 12 graduate from the school is awarded a Collegiate Partnership Scholarship to attend Bond University, a private university in Queensland, with 50% of tuition for an undergraduate degree provided.

Outdoor education 
The Yarra Junction campus hosts student camps at various year levels: Year 3 students attend for one day, Year 5 students for three days, Year 7 students have one week camps, and Year 8 students have 11-day programmes including a three-day outdoor camping activity. At each of the camps involving overnight stays by students, student leaders currently in Years 10 and 11 accompany groups for the duration of their programmes. Year 10 and 11 students wishing to act as leaders attend a leadership camp at the campus at the end of the previous school year, and a number are then selected to take part in student camps. As part of various camps, students stay in eco-cabins and must monitor their use of both water and electricity. Lessons also take place at Wadambawilam and at the campus dairy.

Student life 
Caulfield Grammar School offers an extracurricular activities programme for students. The major components of the programme are sport, music and the arts.

Sport 

Students from Years 5 to 12 participate in school sport as part of the APS competition.

Caulfield Grammar was one of the founding members of the Schools' Association of Victoria in 1882, but when the legitimacy of the association's amateur status was questioned, Caulfield Grammar and Brighton Grammar School formed the Schools' Amateur Athletic Association of Victoria in 1911 (renamed the Associated Grammar Schools of Victoria in 1921), and were joined by other Melbourne private and church schools in the competition. In 1958, Caulfield Grammar accepted an offer to join the Associated Public Schools of Victoria. The APS was Victoria's most competitive school sporting association, and after initially poor results the school introduced compulsory involvement in sporting teams in 1958 in an attempt to improve its performance. Caulfield Grammar currently holds an APS record for winning 12 consecutive APS Boys' Athletics Championships from 1994 to 2005, and has won numerous 1st Division premierships throughout its history. The First XVIII football team won 18 consecutive premierships from 1913 to 1930 – the longest championship run for a Caulfield Grammar Firsts team.

For students from Years 5 to 12, inter-school sport is a compulsory activity. Teams usually train twice a week, often travelling between Caulfield and Wheelers Hill or to other sporting venues, and play matches against other APS schools on Saturdays. Sports played include cricket, football, rowing, athletics and swimming. A United Kingdom Cricket and Tennis tour every three years sees Caulfield Grammar students play matches against students from such schools as Eton College and The King's School, Canterbury.

The main facilities for sport are shared over both Caulfield and Wheelers Hill campus. At Caulfield Grammar, the Lindsay Thompson Centre is used for indoor sports such as basketball and netball, and the Alfred Mills Oval is the traditional home of the First XI cricket and First XVIII football teams. The oval has been a venue of matches in the 2004 Commonwealth Bank Under 19 Cricket Championships, and the venue for a match between the England women's cricket team and the Victoria Spirit women's team in January 2008. Wheelers Hill includes four sports ovals, AstroTurf tennis and hockey courts, and outdoor netball courts.

APS & AGSV/APS Premierships 
Caulfield Grammar School has won the following APS and AGSV/APS premierships.

Boys:

 Athletics (16) - 1985, 1986, 1987, 1990, 1994, 1995, 1996, 1997, 1998, 1999, 2000, 2001, 2002, 2003, 2004, 2005
 Badminton - 1998
 Basketball (9) - 2005, 2006, 2008, 2009, 2012, 2013, 2015, 2016, 2021
 Cricket (5) - 1967, 1968, 1971, 1972, 1988
 Cross Country (2) - 1991, 1992
 Football (5) - 1967, 1989, 2007, 2019, 2022
 Futsal - 2013, 2014
 Hockey (2) - 2013, 2015
 Soccer - 1995
 Swimming (5) - 2014, 2015, 2017, 2018, 2019
 Swimming & Diving* (2) - 2002, 2003
 Tennis (4) - 1988, 2013, 2014, 2016
 Volleyball (7) - 2004, 2005, 2007, 2009, 2010, 2011, 2013

Girls:

 Athletics (10) - 1996, 1997, 2000, 2001, 2003, 2007, 2008, 2009, 2010, 2011
 Badminton (2) - 2012, 2019
 Basketball (13) - 1999, 2001, 2002, 2003, 2004, 2005, 2006, 2009, 2010, 2013, 2016, 2017, 2021
 Cross Country - 2000
 Diving (3) - 2014, 2016, 2018
 Football (3) - 2018, 2019, 2021
 Hockey (13) - 1996, 1997, 1999, 2001, 2002, 2003, 2004, 2005, 2006, 2007, 2008, 2009, 2010
 Netball (7) - 1997, 1998, 1999, 2003, 2006, 2011, 2017
 Rowing (2) - 2012, 2013
 Soccer (4) - 2004, 2005, 2011, 2012
 Softball (16) - 1993, 1994, 1995, 1996, 1997, 2001, 2002, 2006, 2007, 2010, 2011, 2012, 2015, 2017, 2018, 2020
 Swimming (6) - 1996, 2016, 2017, 2018, 2019, 2021
 Swimming & Diving* (10) - 1998, 1999, 2000, 2001, 2002, 2003, 2004, 2005, 2006, 2011
 Tennis (4) - 2000, 2006, 2007, 2008
 Volleyball - 2010
 Water Polo (5) - 2014, 2016, 2017, 2018, 2019

*From 1998 until 2013, swimming and diving events were awarded as a single premiership.

The Arts 
Primary students in Year 2 learn to play either the violin, viola, cello or double bass and for most students this is their first introduction to the Caulfield Grammar School music programme. Year 5 students choose one of seven of woodwind and brass instruments to learn for a year. Year 7 students also take part in compulsory music tuition where they may choose one instrument to learn as part of a small group, with a range of musical groups represented including guitars, brass, woodwind and percussion. They may also take part in a singing group, or work in a composition workshop where they learn about songwriting, patterns in music and improvisation. Students who wish to learn an instrument in private lessons may do so from prep through to Year 12, and many of these musicians go on to join various musical ensembles available at Caulfield Grammar. School bands, choirs and orchestras are open to students from Year 3 onwards, and many of these musical groups are on show at the annual Caulfield Grammar School Concert at Melbourne's Hamer Hall. Senior choirs and bands also take part in such events as the Kodaly Choral Festival and Melbourne Bands Festival.

Caulfield Grammar's most senior orchestral group is the Galamian Orchestra, which is primarily a string group, but expands to add other instruments when required. The group went on a small tour to England and Austria in June and July 2000. In 2006, the "No Strings Attached" stage band and the senior concert band toured European nations, and was featured in the Montreux Jazz Festival on 5 July 2006. School music groups rehearse regularly in the music departments at each of the three campuses, and students from Wheelers Hill and Caulfield perform together in the three premier groups at Caulfield Grammar – the Galamian Orchestra, the No Strings Attached stage band, and the Chamber Choir. These groups perform at major school events such as the annual year-ending Speech Night presentations, the Founders' Day chapel service, and the School Concert, as well as performing at music festivals in Melbourne and on tours, such as ‘Generations In Jazz’ in Mount Gambier. In 2005 renowned Australian jazz musician James Morrison performed with the "No Strings Attached" stage band at Monash University.

Caulfield Grammar also competes in the Debaters Association of Victoria Schools competition, and Caulfield Campus is the host venue for the Caulfield Grammar regional competition. Five debates are held each year, and Caulfield Grammar teams debate against other Melbourne schools on various current interest topics. Students are also involved in mooting, where teams argue legal matters based on evidence and precedent, and compete in the Bond University Mooting competition.

The school's theatre department produces productions at both primary and secondary level across all three metropolitan campuses. Previously, students have performed in drama tours to European and Asian countries, such as the 2019 Theatre and Dance Tour to the UK. Many productions and actors have been recognised in the Music Theatre Guild of Victoria.

Alumni 

All past students of the school are members of the Caulfield Grammarians' Association (CGA), which coordinates reunions, alumni sporting teams and other activities for alumni, known as Caulfield Grammarians. The CGA was formed in 1885, and is believed to have been in continuous operation since 1906, the year of the 25th anniversary of Caulfield Grammar's founding. The Caulfield Grammarians Football Club competes in the Victorian Amateur Football Association, and has been represented by notable former Australian rules football players, including Dean Anderson and Duncan Kellaway (both past students of Caulfield Grammar), as well as Glenn Archer and Anthony Stevens.

A number of Caulfield Grammar alumni have made significant contributions in the fields of government, sports, music, business and academia among others. Among those who have had involvement in politics, Peter Dowding (Western Australia) and Lindsay Thompson (Victoria), have served as state premiers. Free-style swimmer Mack Horton has won multiple medals at the Olympic Games, World Championships and Commonwealth Games, including a gold medal in the 400m freestyle event at the 2016 Summer Olympics in Rio de Janeiro, Brazil. Chris Judd and John Schultz have both been awarded the Brownlow Medal for the fairest and best player in the Victorian/Australian Football League, and John Landy has held both the men's mile world record in athletics and the office of Governor of Victoria. John Clifford Valentine Behan, later second Warden of Trinity College at the University of Melbourne, became the first Victorian Rhodes Scholar after graduating as the Dux of Caulfield Grammar School in 1895. Fred Walker founded the company that first created and sold Vegemite, an Australian spread and cultural icon.

The rock group The Birthday Party was formed by Nick Cave, Mick Harvey and Phill Calvert while they were students at the school in 1973, and Cave and Harvey would later form the band Nick Cave and the Bad Seeds, which released Top 10 albums in Australia and the United Kingdom. Cave and Harvey had been members of the school choir under the direction of Norman Kaye, who became a noted actor and musician after working at Caulfield Grammar as a music teacher and choirmaster. Graduating in 2017, Alexis 'Lexie' Van Maanen performed as Mistress in Evita, touring Australia. Infamous conman, the late Christopher Skase was a former student. Former professional Dota 2 player,  Anathan "ana" Pham was a former student before he dropped out in order to pursue a career in esports.

See also 
 List of schools in Victoria, Australia
 Caulfield Grammarians Football Club
 A4LE James D. MacConnell Award winner 2017

Further reading 
 
 Caulfield Grammar School (2005). One School Six Campuses. Retrieved 10 April 2005.

References

External links 
 Caulfield Grammar School website
 The Caulfield Grammarians' Association (alumni association)

Educational institutions established in 1881
Associated Public Schools of Victoria
Anglican primary schools in Melbourne
Anglican secondary schools in Melbourne
Boarding schools in Victoria (Australia)
Heritage-listed buildings in Melbourne
Member schools of the Headmasters' and Headmistresses' Conference
Junior School Heads Association of Australia Member Schools
1881 establishments in Australia
Buildings and structures in the City of Glen Eira
Caulfield Grammar School
Buildings and structures in the City of Monash
Buildings and structures in the City of Stonnington